Trinity F.C. is a football club based on the Channel Island of Jersey. They are affiliated to the Jersey Football Association and play in the Jersey Football Combination Premiership.

History
Trinty Football and Social Club are based at Riley Field, opposite Trinity School in Jersey.  The club formed in 1930, making our team part of Jersey's football history.  The club has always had a family attitude to all the players which can be seen in the family events that are held at the club.  All players are taught by trained coaches the importance of respect for themselves as well as other players and their coaches when they are on and off the pitch.  The players have fun and learn essential skills in football and also good sportmanship.  We have recently boosted the numbers of our minis and youth teams and have also started an over 35s team made up of some of the Dads of our younger players!

Stadium
Riley Field, opposite Trinity School in Jersey.

{
  "type": "FeatureCollection",
  "features": [
    {
      "type": "Feature",
      "properties": {},
      "geometry": {
        "type": "Point",
        "coordinates": [
          -2.097403764855699,
          49.230418584822296
        ]
      }
    }
  ]
}

References

Football clubs in Jersey